Railways Africa  is a publication covering railways in Africa.  It is published 6 times per year in print and weekly online.

See also
 List of railroad-related periodicals

External links
 Railways Africa official website

Bi-monthly magazines
Magazines established in 1954
Rail transport in Africa
Rail transport magazines
Magazines published in South Africa
English-language magazines published in South Africa